The 2016–17 season was the 48th campaign of the Scottish Basketball Championship, the national basketball league of Scotland. 18 teams were split into Division 1, featuring 10 teams, and Division 2, featuring 8 teams. Falkirk Fury won their 5th league title.

Teams

The line-up for the 2016-17 season features the following teams:

Division 1
Boroughmuir Blaze
City of Edinburgh Kings
Dunfermline Reign
Edinburgh University
Sony Centre Fury
Glasgow Storm
Glasgow University
Stirling Knights
St Mirren West College Scotland
Tayside Musketeers

Division 2
Ayrshire Tornadoes
Boroughmuir Blaze B
City of Edinburgh Kings B
Edinburgh Lions
Glasgow University B
Heriot Watt University
Pleasance
West Lothian Wolves

Format
In Division 1, each team plays each other twice, once home, once away, for a total of 18 games.

In Division 2, each team plays each other twice, once home, once away, for a total of 14 games.

Division 1

League table

Tayside Musketeers, sitting with a 2-9 record, withdrew from the league thereby conceding their final seven games of the season. Their two wins, against Stirling Knights (79-71), and Edinburgh University (75-73) were expunged and replaced with 20-0 defeats.

Playoffs

Quarter-finals

Semi-finals

Final

Division 2

League table

Playoffs

Semi-finals

Final

Scottish Cup
Scottish Cup (basketball)

Preliminary round

1st Round

Quarter-finals

Semi-finals

Final

Chairman's Cup
The Chairman's Cup is a national knockout competition for teams who play outwith the National League system.

Preliminary round

1st Round

Quarter-finals

Semi-finals

Final

References

Scottish Basketball Championship Men seasons
Scotland
Scotland
basketball
basketball